The Resolution Foundation is an independent British think tank established in 2005. Its stated aim is to improve the standard of living of low- and middle-income families.

Appointments
In June 2015, the former Conservative MP David Willetts took over as executive chairman. At the same time, Torsten Bell, a former senior advisor to Ed Miliband, was appointed as the organisation's director to lead what the Foundation described as "an expanded programme of work". , Willetts is president of the Foundation's Advisory Council and Intergenerational Centre, and Bell is chief executive.

Prior to the appointment of Willetts and Bell, the organisation was led by a chief executive: Sue Regan from 2005 to 2010; Gavin Kelly from 2010 to 2015. Kelly then  became the CEO of the Resolution Trust, which is the think tank's primary funder.

Publications
The Foundation has hosted a number of major reviews. The Commission on Living Standards, chaired by Clive Cowdery, ran from 2011 to 2012. The 'Resolution Foundation Review of the Future of the National Minimum Wage' in 2013 and 2014 was chaired by Sir George Bain, and set out proposals to strengthen the minimum wage. This report was referenced by Chancellor George Osborne when the National Living Wage was announced in 2015. The 'Intergenerational Commission' ran from 2016 to 2018, chaired by David Willetts. This was succeeded by the 'Intergenerational Centre', which was established "as a home for analysis and policy thinking on living standards through a generational lens".

In 2018, a Macroeconomic Policy Unit was established "with the aim of contributing to a more inclusive and better informed macroeconomic policy debate".

The Resolution Foundation produces some recurring research publications. These include annual 'Low Pay Britain' reports, an annual 'Living Standards Audit', an annual 'Living Standards Outlook', and a quarterly 'Earnings Outlook'.

The Foundation also calculates the rates of the voluntary UK and London Living Wages each year, on behalf of the Living Wage Foundation and using the Minimum Income Standard.

Funding 
In the year ending 30 September 2014, its annual income was £1,135,828. The bulk of its funding comes from the Resolution Trust established by Clive Cowdery. It has been awarded an A rating for transparency by the Who Funds You? project.

See also 
 Income in the United Kingdom
 Poverty in the United Kingdom

References

External links
Resolution Foundation
Commission on Living Standards

Public policy research
Public policy think tanks based in the United Kingdom
Political and economic think tanks based in the United Kingdom
Socio-economic mobility